Kỳ Anh is a rural district of Hà Tĩnh province in the North Central Coast region of Vietnam. As of 2015 the district had a population of 120,518. The district covers an area of 1,058 km². The district capital lies at Kỳ Anh.

From 16 May 2015, Ky Anh District separated into two administrative units: Ky Anh Town and Ky Anh District (new).

References

Districts of Hà Tĩnh province